Gold Pan Creek is a creek located in the Cassiar Country region of British Columbia.  The creek is a tributary of Little Eagle River about 10 miles east of Dease Lake.  This creek was discovered in the fall of 1925 by two men named Grady and Ford.  Gold was discovered in Gold Pan Creek.  By the end of 1925, there were 165 claims staked on the creek. Hand sluices were used to mine the creek.

References

Rivers of British Columbia
Cassiar Country